Glass Duo  was founded by Anna and Arkadiusz Szafraniec. They are the only glass harp music group in Poland, one of few professional ensembles worldwide.

They perform both solo concerts and concerts with additional musicians. They have performed with string quartets, various chamber ensembles, even symphony orchestras. They have had several world premieres of musical works composed especially for them. They have also made numerous recordings for radio, TV and theatre productions.

Notable performances
The GlassDuo performed at many festivals, e.g.

 Singapore Festival of Arts – Singapore
 altstadtherbst kulturfestival – Düsseldorf, Germany
 Internationaal Festival van Vlaanderen Gent – Belgium
 International Music Festival, Mood Indigo – Mumbai, India
 International Mozart Festival "Mozartiana" – Gdansk, Poland
 International Festival "Round About Chopin" – Vienna, Austria
 Klaipėda Music Spring – Lithuania
 Polish Harmonies Chopin & Beyond – Austin, US
 festival di Santo Stefano – Bologna, Italy
 La Folle Journee – Warsaw, Poland
 International Easter Music Festival "RESUREXIT" – Šiauliai, Lithuania
 Automne Musical de Marchienne" – Belgium
 Warsaw Autumn – Poland
 International Bach Festival "Bakhosluzheniye" – Kaliningrad, Russia
 Royal Concerts Chamber Ensemble Festival – Warsaw, Poland
 Days of Karol Szymanowski's Music – Zakopane, Poland
 International Festival "Percussion Solo and in a Band" – Poland
 International Classical Music Festival of Mažeikiai – Lithuania

References

External links 
 GlassDuo official website
 'The Glass Duo' to perform in Mumbai - Times of India
 From Poland: The Mesmerizing Tones of Glassduo From Poland: The Mesmerizing Tones of Glassduo
 05-16-2010 Glass Duo in Houston
 Events - Haus der Musik

Polish musical groups
Glass harp players
Male–female musical duos